The National Inventory of Dams (NID) is a congressionally authorized database documenting dams in the United States and its territories. It is maintained and published by the US Army Corps of Engineers. It contains information about each dam's location, size, purpose, type, last inspection and regulatory facts.

References

External links

Government-owned websites of the United States
United States Army Corps of Engineers